Kid-E-Cats is a Russian animated television series for preschoolers and kindergarteners made by CTC Media and Studio Metrafilms.

The television series has been launched in 148 countries on Nick Jr. since the end of November 2017.
French free-to-air kids TV channel Gulli has picked up season one and two (for a total of 156 x five minutes) of animated preschool series Kid-E-Cats from Paris distributor APC Kids. Gulli began airing the show on January 6, 2020.

Plot
The series follows Cookie, Pudding and their little sister Candy. They like to play, eat sweets and investigate about things around them. Every day their inquisitive mind leads the three kittens to new adventures. With the wise advice of their caring parents, the kittens solve all the problems and everything always end well. With their friends Cupcake, Chase, Boris, Smudge, Mustard, Bow, Raisin and Dart, they have very fun and interesting times investigating new things around them every day.

Many other cats live in the town. They all have different ways of doing things but it always comes to a common decision. Catopolis AKA Meowli City is a safe and peaceful place where little kittens under the care of their parents learn how to think and take decisions, empathize and be friends.

In every episode, Cookie, Candy and Pudding, along with Dad, Mom, Grandma, Grandpa, Uncle Muffin, Aunt Cinnamon and their little cousin Bagel, try to make the world a better place for their family and friends.

Characters

Main
Cookie (Russian - Коржик (Shortbread / Korzhik) - (Voiced by Lori Gardner and Kate Bristol) - the most restless and hyperactive kitten. He is brave and the first one to propose bold and smart ideas seeking to act only, he cannot focus of his attention on just one thing, and his mind flows, jumping from one to another proposal. He is seen to be energetic and keen on sports and likes outdoor games, such as football and badminton, and he is fond of archery, just like his grandma. He can be very helpful to his parents, whenever he's needed. He is the second kitten to be born in the family, and he is also the middle child.
Pudding (Russian - Компот (Compote)) - (Voiced by Billy Bob Thompson) (David Holt) (UK Dub) an inquisitive and very knowledgeable kitten for his age. He reads a lot but since he is just a kitten, his knowledge is purely theoretical. He collects puzzles, reads riddles, and can even beat Mommy Cat in checkers. Just like his name, he is a bit chubby. He is keen on eating sweets and you can always find a lot of them in his pockets. He is the oldest kitten in the family, but everyone takes care of him.
Candy (Russian - Карамелька (Caramel)) - (Voiced by Kate Bristol) is the youngest child and family member, but is just as sensible as the other kittens. She is also just as smart as the other kittens by nature when it comes to practical things. However, she can sometimes go to far, and be annoying to her older brothers. When she wins contests, she usually acts victorious by being quite bossy to her older brothers. Having different interests among her elderly brothers, she is quite a lot smaller than they are. However, this family “runt” is just as mature and emotionally smart as the boys are (and sometimes finds a way to help the adults!). Having subconscious worldly wisdom very often, it is usually (not all the time!) Candy who finds a way out of difficult situations. It happens that copying her mother's behavior, she helps and works with her brothers to finding a solution to the problem. Her key phrases are "I know what to do!", or "I have a good idea!". 
Dad (Russian - Котя (The Cat) (Voiced by Marc Thompson) (Andy Turvey) (uk dub) is the father of the Kid-E-Cats. He works at the candy shop and he is always very clumsy.
Mom (Russian - Кисуля (Kitty)) - (Voiced by Erica Schroeder) is the mother of the Kid-E-Cats. She's always cooking up food.
Grandma - (Russian - Бабушка (Babushka)) (Voiced by Erica Schroeder) is the grandmother of the Kid-E-Cats, she likes cooking and according to the Season 1 episode Treasure, she liked playing as a kid. She is Mom’s mother.
Grandpa - (Russian - Дедушка (Dedushka) (Voiced by Tom Wayland) is the grandfather of the Kid-E-Cats, according to the Season 1 episode Kittens go Diving AKA Diving Lesson. He is Dad’s father.
Uncle Muffin (Russian - Дядя Кекс (Dyadya Keks)) - (Voiced by Wayne Grayson) is the uncle of the Kid-E-Cats, he is Dad’s brother, and he is extremely educated.
Aunt Cinnamon (Russian - Тётя Корица (Tyotya Koritsa)) - (Voiced by Lori Gardner)  is the cats' aunt. She is Mom’s sister.

Friends
Boris (Russian - Нудик (Tedious/Nudik)) - (Voiced by Tom Wayland) is a shy gray cat who is one of the Kid-E-Cats’ friends, and likes the circus culture and wants to be a clown when he grows up.
Cupcake (Russian - Лапочка (Honey/Lapochka)) - (Voiced by Erica Schroeder) is a pink cat who is one of the Kid-E-Cats’ friends. She likes beautiful and pretty things. She is best friends with Candy.
Smudge (Russian - Сажик (Soot/Sajik)) - (Voiced by Alyson Leigh Rosenfeld) is a black cat. He is one of the Kid-E-Cats’ friends, and likes scary and horrifying things. He also likes scaring his friends sometimes.
Chase (Russian - Гоня (Gonya)) - (Voiced by Erica Schroeder) is a black and white cat. He is another one of the Kid-E-Cats’ friends, and he likes the space/galaxy culture and would like to meet a real life alien one day. He is best friends with Cookie.
Dart (Russian - Шуруп (Screw/Shurup) - (Voiced by Erica Schroeder) is a red cat. He is one of the Kid-E-Cats’ friends, and likes math. Albert Einstein’s famous equation, E=MC^2, is even seen on his jumper.
Mustard (Russian - Горчица (Gorchitsa)) - (Voiced by Alyson Leigh Rosenfeld) is a violet cat and she is one of the Kid-E-Cats’ friends. Like Pudding, she likes sweets. Sometimes, she could be angry and in a bad mood and could also occasionally be seen to be rude to her friends.
Bow (Russian - Бантик (Bantik)) - (Voiced by Tom Wayland) is a blue cat, he is one of the Kid-E-Cats' friends and likes fairy tales and music and wants to be an actor when he grows up. He is similar to Gumball from The Amazing World of Gumball.  Because he is other than Doraemon that have no ears.
Raisin (Russian - Изюм (Izyum)) - (Voiced by Alyson Leigh Rosenfeld) is a yellow cat, one of the Kid-E-Cats' friends and he likes painting.

Others

Cupcake's Mother - (voiced by Kate Bristol) is Cupcake's mother. She is a pianist and teaches playing piano to Candy.
Cupcake's Father - is Cupcake's father. He appears in episode "Dance".
Smudge's father - is Smudge's father. He is a builder.
Chase's mother - (voiced by Alyson Leigh Rosenfeld) is Chase's mother, and she works in a shop.
Chase's dad - (voiced by Marc Thompson) is Chase's dad. He is a coach.
Dart's dad - (voiced by Marc Thompson) is Dart's father. With Dart, They work as firefighters.

Ft. Characters
Police - (voiced by Tom Wayland)
Female pastry - (voiced by Laurie Hymes)
Stewardess - (voiced by Kate Bristol)
Lady Cat - (voiced by Tom Wayland)
TV Narrator - (voiced by Lori Gardner)
Merchandise voice - (voiced by Tom Wayland)
Bagel - the Kid-E-Cats' cousin.

References

External links

2015 Russian television series debuts
2010s animated television series
2020s animated television series
Russian children's animated fantasy television series
Animated preschool education television series
2010s preschool education television series
2020s preschool education television series
STS (TV channel) original programming
Nick Jr. original programming
Animated television series about cats
Flash television shows